David Martin Wilson is the fourteenth and current Clerk of the New Zealand House of Representatives ("Clerk of the House"). His first seven-year term as Clerk of the House began on 6 July 2015, following the retirement of Mary Harris In May 2022, he was reappointed for a further seven-year term, beginning on 6 July 2022.

David Wilson grew up in Dunedin and was educated at St Pauls High School and the University of Otago, where he graduated with a Bachelor of Arts (with Honours, majoring in History) degree in 1991 and a Master of Arts (History) in 1993. While working in Wellington he continued his studies at Massey University, graduating with a Master of Management degree in 2004.

He  began his state sector career when he was appointed as a Parliamentary Officer with the Office of the Clerk of the House of Representatives in February 1995. He left the Office of the Clerk of the House in July 1999 to become a Senior Policy Analyst with the Department for Courts. In February 2002 he was appointed as a Senior Policy Analyst (Censorship) with the Department of Internal Affairs and in November 2004 he became the Information and Policy manager with the Office of Film and Literature Classification.

In February 2008 he re-joined the Office of the Clerk of the House as a Clerk-Assistant, initially with responsibility for provision of services to Select Committees, and from February 2013 with responsibility for the House Services group.

From 2012 to 2015 Mr Wilson was the President of the Australia and New Zealand Association of Clerks-at-the-Table.

References

Clerks of the New Zealand House of Representatives
1970 births
People from Lawrence, New Zealand
Living people
People educated at Trinity Catholic College, Dunedin